Fan fiction is fictional writing written in an unauthorized amateur capacity as fans, which is based on an existing work of fiction.

Fan Fiction may also refer to:

 "Fan Fiction" (Supernatural), a season 10 episode of Supernatural
 "Fan Fiction" (Only Murders in the Building), a 2021 episode of the TV series Only Murders in the Building

Other uses
 FanFiction.Net, US fanfiction website
 Pastiche, unauthorized professional derivative fiction